Jaylah Ji'mya Hickmon (born August 14, 1998), known professionally as Doechii (previously known as Iamdoechii), is an American rapper and singer. After releasing her debut EP, Oh the Places You'll Go (2020), she rose to prominence with the viral success of her song "Yucky Blucky Fruitcake" on TikTok in 2021. In 2022, she signed with Top Dawg Entertainment and Capitol Records, through which she released her sophomore EP, She/Her/Black Bitch.

She has received nominations for an MTV Video Music Award, and two Soul Train Music Award. In 2023, she was awarded the Rising Star Award from Billboard Women in Music.

Life and career
Jaylah Ji'mya Hickmon was born on August 14, 1998, in Tampa, Florida, where she was also raised. She attended Howard W. Blake High School in Tampa and grew up doing ballet, tap dancing, acting, cheerleading, and gymnastics. She first started making music in 2015, and released her debut song "Girls" on SoundCloud in 2016 as Iamdoechii. Her project, Coven Music Session, Vol. 1, was released in 2019.

Doechii's debut EP, Oh the Places You'll Go, was self-funded and released in 2020. It was described by Rolling Stone as a mix of pop, dance, and hip hop. "Yucky Blucky Fruitcake", a single from the EP released in September 2020, was inspired by her reading The Artist's Way and went viral on TikTok in 2021, earning her attention from record labels. Also in 2021, she released her second EP, Bra-Less; she was featured on Isaiah Rashad's song "Wat U Sed" from his album, The House Is Burning, which she performed with Rashad at the 2021 BET Hip Hop Awards; and was an opening act during SZA's 2021 tour. In March 2022, she signed with Capitol Records and Top Dawg Entertainment, making her the first female rapper on the latter label. That same month, she released "Persuasive", her first release through Top Dawg, and appeared as a featured artist on David Guetta and Afrojack's song "Trampoline" alongside Missy Elliott and Bia. 

In April 2022, she released the song "Crazy" with a music video, which featured heavy nudity and violence. Her sophomore EP and her first major label release, She / Her / Black Bitch, was released on August 5, 2022. Her July 2022 performance of her song "Persuasive" was nominated for Push Performance of the Year at the 2022 MTV Video Music Awards.

Musical style
Rolling Stones Mankaprr Conteh described Doechii's rap delivery as "animated" and her song narratives as "quirky". Her music has frequently been compared to that of the Notorious B.I.G., Nicki Minaj, Missy Elliott, and Azealia Banks. She has described her music as alternative hip hop, and has cited Minaj and Lauryn Hill as her major musical influences, referring to them as "powerful women".

Discography

Extended plays

Singles

As lead artist

As featured artist

Guest appearances

Notes

Awards and nominations

References

1998 births
Living people
African-American women singer-songwriters
African-American women rappers
American women rappers
21st-century American rappers
21st-century women rappers
Musicians from Tampa, Florida
Top Dawg Entertainment artists
Alternative hip hop musicians
Pop rappers
Southern hip hop musicians